The 1992 Ilva Trophy was a women's tennis tournament played on outdoor clay courts at the Circulo Tennis Ilva Taranto in Taranto, Italy that was part of the WTA Tier V category of the 1992 WTA Tour. It was the sixth edition of the tournament and was held from 28 April until 3 May 1992. First-seeded Julie Halard won the singles title and earned $18,000 first-prize money.

Finals

Singles

 Julie Halard defeated   Emanuela Zardo 6–0, 7–5
 It was Halard's 1st singles title of the year and the 2nd of her career.

Doubles

 Amanda Coetzer /  Inés Gorrochategui defeated  Rachel McQuillan /  Radka Zrubáková 4–6, 6–3, 7–3(7–0)

References

External links
 ITF tournament edition details
 Tournament draws

Mantegazza Cup
Ilva Trophy
1992 in Italian women's sport
Ilva Trophy
Ilva Trophy
1992 in Italian tennis